James Hoban Jr. (1808–1846) was an American lawyer who served as United States Attorney for the District of Columbia in the 1840s. He was said to be the spit and image of his father, James Hoban, an Irish-American architect who designed the White House.
Marriage: 22 November 1831; Washington, District of Columbia, USA; to Marion Blackwell French (1813-1890)

References

United States Attorneys for the District of Columbia
American people of Irish descent
19th-century American lawyers
1808 births
1846 deaths

 <ref District of Columbia, Marriage Records,1810-1953/ref>